Sir Richard Lodowick Edward Montagu Rees, 2nd Baronet (4 April 1900 – 24 July 1970) was a British diplomat, writer and painter.

Rees was the son of  Sir John Rees, 1st Baronet and his wife Mary Catherine Dormer. His sister was the pilot Rosemary Rees, Lady du Cros, MBE. He was educated at West Downs School, Eton and Trinity College, Cambridge. His father, who had been an administrator in British India and a Liberal politician, died in 1922 and he inherited the baronetcy. 

He was for a while an attache at the British Embassy in Berlin. In 1925 he became a lecturer at the Worker's Educational Association in London, and also acted as Treasurer there. He became editor of Adelphi in 1930, where he provided encouragement to George Orwell among others. He was the inspiration for the wealthy Ravelston, publisher of the socialist magazine Antichrist, in Orwell's Keep the Aspidistra Flying.

In the Spanish Civil War he drove ambulances in Catalonia. 

During World War II, Sir Richard served in the Royal Naval Volunteer Reserve (RNVR). His service included an attachment to the French Navy from 1943, serving as a Liaison Officer (LO) on board ships of the newly-integrated Mediterranean Fleet, with whom he was awarded the Croix de Guerre.

As well as writing several books, he translated the works of Simone Weil and was the literary executor of George Orwell and R. H. Tawney. In addition to writing, he was a painter, exhibiting at the Royal Academy.

Publications

Brave Men: A study of D H Lawrence and Simone Weil (Victor Gollancz, London, 1958)
For Love or Money (Secker & Warburg, London, 1960)
George Orwell: Fugitive from the Camp of Victory (Secker & Warburg, London, 1961)
A Theory of my Time (Secker & Warburg, London, 1963) 
Simone Weil: A Sketch for a Portrait (Oxford University Press, London, 1966)

Edited with John Middleton Murry
Selected criticism 1916 to 1957 (Oxford University Press, London, 1960) 
Poets, Critics, Mystics (Feffer & Simons, London & Amsterdam, 1970)

Translations with Jane Degras
Alfred Grosser Western Germany: From defeat to rearmament (George Allen & Unwin, London, 1955)
Jules Monnerot Sociology of Communism (George Allen & Unwin, London, 1953) 
Simone Weil Selected Essays (Oxford University Press, London, 1962)
Simone Weil Seventy Letters (Oxford University Press, London, 1965)
Simone Weil On Science, Necessity, and the Love of God (Oxford University Press, London, 1968) 
Simone Weil First and Last Notebooks (Oxford University Press, London, 1970

Arms

References

1900 births
1970 deaths
Baronets in the Baronetage of the United Kingdom
English writers
People educated at Eton College
Alumni of Trinity College, Cambridge
George Orwell
People educated at West Downs School
Royal Navy officers of World War II
Recipients of the Croix de Guerre 1939–1945 (France)
People of the Spanish Civil War